The 2016 Campeonato Brasileiro Série A was the 60th season of the Série A, the top level of professional football in Brazil, and the 13th edition in a double round-robin since its establishment in 2003. The season began on 15 May 2016 and ended on 11 December 2016. Fixtures for the 2016 season were announced on 25 April 2016. Palmeiras won the title, their ninth overall.

Format and results
For the fourteenth consecutive season, the tournament was played in a double round-robin system. The team with most points at the end of the season was declared champion. The bottom four teams were relegated and will play in the Campeonato Brasileiro Série B in the 2017 season.

Atlético Mineiro and Chapecoense did not play their last match due to the accident involving 71 deaths (including 19 Chapecoense players) on 28 November 2016. Due to a lack of squad depth, both teams decided to forfeit the game resulting in Chapecoense finishing 11th and Atlético Mineiro finishing 4th. Match officials declared a double W.O., as CBF refused to cancel the match.

International qualification
The Série A served as a qualifier to CONMEBOL's 2017 Copa Libertadores. The top-three teams in the standings qualified to the Second Stage of the competition, while from the fourth to sixth place in the standings qualified to the First Stage.

And this change also impacts on the Copa Sudamericana, whose vacancies are again to be distributed in the stockmarket enot more by Copa do Brasil.

Tiebreakers
In case of a tie on points between two or more clubs, tiebreakers are applied in the following order:

Number of wins;
Goal difference;
Goals for;
Head to Head;
Fewer red cards;
Fewest yellow cards;
Draw.

With respect to the fourth criterion (direct confrontation), it is considered the result of the combined game, or the result of 180 minutes. Staying tie, the tie will be made by the greatest number of goals scored in the opponent's field. The fourth criterion is not considered in the case of a tie between more than two clubs.

Teams

Twenty teams competed in the league – the top sixteen teams from the previous season, as well as four teams promoted from the Série B.

Botafogo became the first club to be promoted after a 1–0 win against Luverdense on 10 November 2015 meant they were guaranteed an automatic place. They returned to the League after only a season's absence. Vitória became the second club to be promoted, after a 3-0 win with Luverdense. They returned to the League after only a season's absence. Santa Cruz became the third club to be promoted, after 3-0 win with Mogi Mirim. They played the Brasileirão for the first time since the 2006 season. América Mineiro became the fourth and final club to be promoted, following a 1–1 draw over Ceará meant they finished above them on points difference and secured the automatic spot.

The four promoted clubs replaced Avaí, Vasco da Gama, Goiás and Joinville. At the end of the season, for the third consecutive year, Rio de Janeiro did not have its four representatives in the first division, largely due to the inconsistent performance of Vasco da Gama and Botafogo, who alternated in relegation in recent seasons.

Stadia and locations
The three clubs based in Rio de Janeiro, Botafogo, Flamengo and Fluminense weren't able to play their home matches in Maracanã or Engenhão Stadiums due to the preparation of these venues for the Olympic Games that were held in the city in August. The clubs used other stadiums for their home matches. Other stadiums used include Arena das Dunas, Arena Fonte Nova, Arena Pernambuco, Kléber Andrade, Mané Garrincha, Mário Helênio, Pacaembu, and Raulino de Oliveira.

Number of teams by state

Personnel and kits

Managerial changes

Foreign players
The clubs can have a maximum of five foreign players in their Campeonato Brasileiro squads.

1 Players holding Brazilian dual nationality.

Standings

League table

Positions by round

Result table

Season statistics

Top scorers

Assists

Hat-tricks

Clean sheets

Awards

Team of the Year

Coach of the Year: Cuca (PAL)
Bola de Ouro (Golden Ball): Gabriel Jesus (PAL)
Serie A Best Newcomer: Vitor Bueno (SAN)
Craque do Campeonato (Player of the Year): Gabriel Jesus (PAL)
Craque da Galera: Danilo (CHA)
Gol Mais Bonito (Best Goal): Zé Roberto (PAL)

Source:

Attendance

Average home attendances

Updated to games played on 11 December 2016.

Source: GloboEsporte.com

References

Campeonato Brasileiro Série A seasons
Campeonato Brasileiro Serie A